Valea Comorilor River may refer to:
 Valea Comorilor, a tributary of the Părău in Brașov County, Romania
 Valea Comorilor, a tributary of the Valea Cerbului in Prahova County, Romania